Tomás Carbonell and Francisco Roig were the defending champions but lost in the final 7–6, 6–3 against Jiří Novák and David Rikl.

Seeds

  Tomás Carbonell /  Francisco Roig (final)
  Hendrik Jan Davids /  Marc-Kevin Goellner (semifinals)
  Jiří Novák /  David Rikl (champions)
  Neil Broad /  Piet Norval (semifinals)

Draw

External links
 1996 Grand Prix Hassan II Doubles draw

1996 ATP Tour
1996 Grand Prix Hassan II